Armand Dumas (5 August 1905 – 13 November 1963) was a Liberal party member of the House of Commons of Canada. Born in Notre-Dame-des-Bois, Quebec, he was a forest engineer and land surveyor by career.

He was first elected at the Villeneuve riding in the 1949 general election then re-elected for successive terms from the 21st to the 24th Canadian Parliaments. Dumas retired from politics as of the 1962 election following medical advice to reduce three-quarters of his workload.

References

External links
 

1905 births
1963 deaths
Members of the House of Commons of Canada from Quebec
Liberal Party of Canada MPs